Santiago G. Socino (born 7 May 1992) is an Argentine rugby union player for Gloucester in Premiership Rugby, his primary position is hooker. Socino moved to England in 2013 to play for Hull RUFC and has also played for Hull Ionians, Darlington Mowden Park, and Rotherham Titans.

Socino originally moved to England as a back row but converted to the front row after singing for Newcastle in 2015. After impressing on loan at Darlington, Socino signed a new contract with Newcastle in May 2016.  He renewed his contract again in March 2018.

In March 2019 he was visited by  coach Mario Ledesma who was contacting European based players with potential to be selected internationally.  It was then announced on 20 May 2019 that Socino was to return to Argentina to join Super Rugby's Jaguares.

In February 2021 it was confirmed that he had signed for Gloucester with immediate effect.

References

Argentine rugby union players
1992 births
Living people
Newcastle Falcons players
Rugby union hookers
Argentina international rugby union players
Jaguares (Super Rugby) players
Rugby union players from Buenos Aires